A dibromoanthracene is a derivative of anthracene with two bromine atoms. All compounds have the formula C14H8Br2. They are all isomers of one another.

References

Anthracenes
Bromine compounds